is the 17th studio album by Japanese singer/songwriter Mari Hamada, released on August 27, 2003, by Tri-M/MidZet House. It was released to coincide with the 20th anniversary of Hamada's music career. The album was reissued alongside Hamada's past releases on January 15, 2014.

Sense of Self peaked at No. 73 on Oricon's albums chart.

Track listing
All lyrics are written by Mari Hamada; all music is composed by Hiroyuki Ohtsuki, except where indicated; all music is arranged by Hiroyuki Ohtsuki and Mari Hamada, except where indicated.

Charts

References

External links 
  (Mari Hamada)
 Official website (Tokuma Japan)
 
 

2003 albums
Japanese-language albums
Mari Hamada albums
Tokuma Shoten albums